Recker is the surname of the following people
Anthony Recker (born in 1983), American baseball catcher
Luke Recker (born in 1978), American basketball player
Udo Recker (born in 1967), German archaeologist

See also
Carlos and Anne Recker House, Indianapolis